Hermann Zwierzina (12 October 1825 in Třemošnice, Bohemia – 19 June 1873 in Mariánské Lázně) was the first mayor of Ostrava 1861–1864.

He was born the only son of metal works owner Josef Zwierzina. During 1836–1840 he studied on the German gymnasium in Olomouc. Then he studied on the Vienna polytechnical school. In 1844 he began working as a mining clerk in the Rothschild mines in the Ostrava region. In 1858, upon his father's death, he took over managing his father's two mines. 

He entered local politics in the 1860s, being elected the first mayor of Moravská Ostrava in 1861 .He also served as a member of the provincial assembly in Brno. During his tenure, he attempted to open an intermediate school, but he was unsuccessful. He did not candidate again in 1865. He was succeeded by Alois Anderka.

He died in Mariánské Lázně, due to typhoid fever on 19 July 1873. His remains were transferred to Moravská Ostrava and were interred at the cemetery four days later.

References
 PRZYBYLOVÁ, Blažena; ŠERKA, Josef. Muži s mocí : portréty starostů Moravské Ostravy 1861–1918. 1. vyd. Šenov u Ostravy: Tilia, 1996. . S. 11–12.

1825 births
1873 deaths
People from Třemošnice
People from the Kingdom of Bohemia
Mayors of Ostrava